The Silchar Dharmanagar Passenger is a passenger train belonging to Northeast Frontier Railway zone of Indian Railways that runs between the largest city in Barak Valley of Assam & second largest city of Tripura, that is, Silchar & Dharmanagar. It is currently being operated with 05677/05678 train numbers on daily basis. The train makes its main halt at Karimganj Junction for 25 minutes & loco/rake reversals also takes place here.

Average speed and frequency 

Route and halts 

The halts of the train are:

 Arunachal Junction
Salchapra
 
Panchgram
 
Rupasibari
Bhanga
Chargola
New Karimganj
 
Suprakandi
Nilambazar
Kayasthagram
Baraigram Junction
Kanaibazar
Patharkandi
Kalkalighat
Chandkhira Bagn
Tilbhum
Churaibari
Nadiapur

Coach composite 

The train consists of 14 coaches:

 12 General Unreserved
 2 Seating cum Luggage Rake

Traction

Both trains are hauled by a Siliguri Loco Shed based WDP-4 diesel locomotive from Silchar to Dharmanagar and vice versa.

Direction Reversal

Train Reverses its direction 1 time:

See also 

 Silchar railway station
 Dharmanagar railway station

Notes

References

External links 

 55677/Silchar - Dharmanagar Passengerr
 55678/Dharmanagar- Silchar Passenger 

Transport in Silchar
Rail transport in Assam
Rail transport in Tripura
Slow and fast passenger trains in India
Railway services introduced in 2016